Sartaveh or Sar Taveh may refer to:
 Sar Taveh, Rostam, Fars Province
 Sartaveh, Kohgiluyeh and Boyer-Ahmad